Kani Band may refer to:
 Kani Band, Baneh
 Kani Band, Saqqez